Asté is a commune in the Hautes-Pyrénées department, France.

Population

See also
Communes of the Hautes-Pyrénées department

References

Communes of Hautes-Pyrénées